Thurston House is a romance novel by American Danielle Steel. The book was first published on August 4, 1983, by Dell Publishing Company. The plot follows Jeremiah, a self-made, wealthy businessman who is looking for a lady in his life; he meets Camille, a younger female whom he had intentions to raise a great family with. For his growing family, Jeremiah builds Thurston House, which becomes one of the most symbolic mansions of San Francisco. It is Steel's fifteenth novel.

References

1983 American novels
American romance novels
Contemporary romance novels
Novels by Danielle Steel
Novels set in San Francisco
Dell Publishing books